Anderson Strathern LLP is a Scottish full-service law firm working in the private client, commercial and public sectors. Offices in Edinburgh, Glasgow, Shetland and East Lothian.

History

Anderson Strathern was founded in 1992, following the merger of two Edinburgh firms, J&F Anderson and Strathern & Blair, both having been in practice for over 200 years.

Anderson Strathern was joined in July 2011 by the partners and staff of property practice Bell & Scott.

Recognition 
In 2010 Anderson Strathern LLP were 'Highly commended' in Climate Change and Sustainability category in the Financial Times Innovative Lawyers Report 2010.

The firm is recognised by legal directories Chambers and Partners and Legal 500.
Chambers & Partners recognises 41 of Anderson Strathern's lawyers as leaders in their respective fields.  The firm is ranked by Chambers and Partners in 34 practice areas, including eight 'Band 1 rankings' in:

 Administrative and Public Law
 Agriculture & Rural Affairs
 Banking Litigation
 Civil Liberties and Human Rights
 Clinical Negligence – Mainly Claimant
 Education – Institutions
 Healthcare
 Parliamentary and Public Affairs

Accreditations & Certifications
Anderson Strathern is accredited as Investors in People at Gold Standard  and is certified holders of ISO 27001 (information security), ISO 9001 (quality management), OHSAS 18001 (health & safety) and ISO 14001 (environmental).

References

External links 

Law firms of Scotland
1992 establishments in Scotland
Organizations established in 1992